Teodor Bordeianu (February 16 1902 – March 19 1969) was a Romanian agronomist and pomologist who was a member of the Romanian Academy. He was born in the village of Marșenița, which is today in Ukraine, and died in Bucharest, Romania.

References
http://www.acad.ro/bdar/armembriLit.php?vidT=B

Titular members of the Romanian Academy
Romanian agronomists